The Lament for Ur, or Lamentation over the city of Ur is a Sumerian lament composed around the time of the fall of Ur to the Elamites and the end of the city's third dynasty (c. 2000 BC).

Laments

It contains one of five known Mesopotamian "city laments"—dirges for ruined cities in the voice of the city's tutelary goddess.

The other city laments are:
The Lament for Sumer and Ur
The Lament for Nippur
The Lament for Eridu
The Lament for Uruk

The Book of Lamentations of the Old Testament, which bewails the destruction of Jerusalem by Nebuchadnezzar II of Babylon in the sixth century B.C., is similar in style and theme to these earlier Mesopotamian laments. Similar laments can be found in the Book of Jeremiah, the Book of Ezekiel and the Book of Psalms, Psalm 137.

Compilation

The first lines of the lament were discovered on the University of Pennsylvania Museum of Archaeology and Anthropology catalogue of the Babylonian section, tablet numbers 2204, 2270, 2302 and 19751 from their excavations at the temple library at Nippur in modern-day Iraq. These were translated by George Aaron Barton in 1918 and first published as "Sumerian religious texts" in Miscellaneous Babylonian Inscriptions, number six, entitled "A prayer for the city of Ur". Barton noted that "from the portions that can be translated it appears to be a prayer for the city of Ur at a time of great danger and distress. It seems impossible to assign it with certainty to any particular period." He noted that it was plausible but unconfirmed to conjecture that it "was written in the last days of Ibbi-Sin when Ur was tottering to its fall".

Edward Chiera published other tablets CBS 3878, 6889, 6905, 7975, 8079, 10227, 13911 and 14110 in "Sumerian texts of varied contents" in 1934, which combined with tablets CBS 3901, 3927, 8023, 9316, 11078 and 14234 to further restore the myth, calling it a "Lamentation over the city of Ur". A further tablet source of the myth is held by the Louvre in Paris, number AO 6446. Others are held in the Ashmolean, Oxford, numbers 1932,415, 1932,522, 1932,526j and 1932,526o. Further tablets were found to be part of the myth in the Hilprecht collection at the University of Jena, Germany, numbers 1426, 1427, 1452, 1575, 1579, 1487, 1510 and 1553. More fragments are held at the Musée d'Art et d'Histoire (Geneva) in Switzerland, MAH 15861 and MAH 16015.

Other translations were made from tablets in the Nippur collection of the Museum of the Ancient Orient in Istanbul (Ni). Samuel Noah Kramer amongst others worked to translate several others from the Istanbul collection including Ni 4496, 1162, 2401, 2510, 2518, 2780, 2911, 3166, 4024, 4424, 4429, 4459, 4474, 4566, 9586, 9599, 9623, 9822 and 9969. Other tablets from the Istanbul collection, numbers Ni 2510 and 2518 were translated  by Edward Chiera in 1924 in "Sumerian religious texts". Sir Charles Leonard Woolley unearthed more tablets at Ur contained in the "Ur excavations texts" from 1928. Other tablets are held in the Vorderasiatisches Museum Berlin and the Yale Babylonian collection. Samuel Noah Kramer compiled twenty-two different fragments into the first complete edition of the Lament, which was published in 1940 by the University of Chicago as Lamentation over the Destruction of Ur (Assyriological Study no. 12). Other tablets and versions were used to bring the myth to its present form with a composite text by Miguel Civil produced in 1989 and latest translations by Thorkild Jacobsen in 1987 and Joachim Krecher in 1996. In 2012 3 new fragments from Nippur (Ni. 4296, Ni. 4383, and Ni. 4566) were published.

Composition

The lament is composed of four hundred and thirty eight lines in eleven kirugu (sections), arranged in stanzas of six lines. It describes the goddess Ningal, who weeps for her city after pleading with the god Enlil to call back a destructive storm. Interspersed with the goddess's wailing are other sections, possibly of different origin and composition; these describe the ghost town that Ur has become, recount the wrath of Enlil's storm, and invoke the protection of the god Nanna (Nergal or Suen) against future calamities. Ningal, the wife of the moon god Nanna, goes on to recall her petition to the leaders of the gods, An and Enlil to change their minds and not to destroy Ur. She does this both in private and in a speech to the Annunaki assembly:

The council of gods decide that the Ur III dynasty, which had reigned for around one hundred years, had its destiny apportioned to end. The temple treasury was raided by invading Elamites and the centre of power in Sumer moved to Isin, while control of trade in Ur passed to several leading families of the city. Kenneth Wade suggested that Terah, the father of Abraham in the Book of Genesis could have been one of the heads of such a leading family. The metaphor of a garden hut being knocked down is used for the destroyed temple of Ur and in subsequent lines this metaphorical language is extended to the rest of the setting, reminiscent of the representation of Jerusalem as a "booth" in the Book of Amos. Ningal bewails:

The different temples throughout the land are described with their patron gods or goddesses abandoning the temples, like sheepfolds:

Edward L. Greenstein has noted the emptying of sheep pens as a metaphor of the destruction of the city. He also notes that the speakers of the laments are generally male lamentation-priests, who take on the characteristics of a traditional female singer and ask for the gods to be appeased so the temples can be restored. Then a goddess, sometimes accompanied by a god notes the devastation and weeps bitterly with a dirge about the destructive storm and an entreats to the gods to return to the sanctuaries. The destruction of the Elamites is compared in the myth to imagery of a rising flood and raging storm. This imagery is facilitated by the title of Enlil as the "god of the winds" The following text suggests that the setting of the myth was subject to a destructive storm prior to its final destruction:

Various buildings are noted to be destroyed in Enlil's storm, including the shrines of Agrun-kug and Egal-mah,  the Ekur (the sanctuary of Enlil), the Iri-kug, the Eridug and the Unug. The destruction of the E-kiš-nu-ĝal is described in detail. 

Images of what was lost, and the scorched earth that was left behind indicate the scale of the catastrophe. The Line 274 reads 

The destruction of the location is reported to Enlil, and his consort Ninlil, who are praised and exalted at the end of the myth.

Discussion

The Lament for Ur has been well known to scholarship and well edited for a long time. Piotr Michalowski has suggested this gave literary primacy to the myth over the Lament for Sumer and Ur, originally called the "Second Lament for Ur", which he argues was chronologically a more archaic version. Philip S. Alexander compares lines seventeen and eighteen of the myth with  "The Lord has done what he purposed, he has carried out his threat; as he ordained long ago, he has demolished without pity", suggesting this could "allude to some mysterious, ineluctable fate ordained for Zion in the distant past":

The devastation of cities and settlements by natural disasters and invaders has been used widely throughout the history of literature since the end of the Third Dynasty of Ur. A stela (pictured) from Iraq depicts a similar destruction of a mountain house at Susa.

Michelle Breyer suggested tribes of neighbouring shepherds destroyed the city and called Ur, "the last great city to fall".

Gallery

Further reading
Gabbay, Uri, and Nili Samet, "An Early Old Babylonian Bilingual Version of the Lamentation over the Destruction of Ur", Revue d’assyriologie et d’archéologie orientale 116.1., pp. 57-67, 2022
 Jacobsen, Thorkild., The Harps that Once .. Sumerian Poetry in Translation. New Haven/London: Yale University Press. 151–166. 1987.
 Klein, Jacob., "Sumerian Canonical Compositions. A. Divine Focus. 4. Lamentations: Lamentation over the Destruction of Sumer and Ur (1.166)". In The Context of Scripture, I: Canonical Compositions from the Biblical World. Hallo, William W. (ed). Leiden/New York/Köln: Brill. 535–539.  1997.
 Kramer, Samuel Noah., Lamentation Over the Destruction of Ur. Assyriological Studies 12. Chicago, IL: Chicago University Press. 1940.
 Rosengarten, Yvonne., Trois Aspects de la Pensée Religieuse Sumérienne. Paris: Editions De Boccard. 1971.
 Witzel, Maurus., "Die Klage über Ur". In Orientalia 14. Rome 185–234. 1945.
 Witzel, Maurus. 1946., "Die Klage über Ur". In Orientalia 15. Rome 46–63. 1945.
 Samet, Nili, "The Lamentation over the Destruction of Ur: A Revised Edition",  Eisenbrauns, 2014

See also
Barton Cylinder
Debate between Winter and Summer
Debate between sheep and grain
Enlil and Ninlil
Old Babylonian oracle
Self-praise of Shulgi (Shulgi D)
Kesh temple hymn
Hymn to Enlil
Sumerian creation myth
Sumerian religion
Sumerian literature
Panbabylonism
Third Dynasty of Ur
Sumer

References

External links
Barton, George Aaron., Miscellaneous Babylonian Inscriptions, Yale University Press, 1918. Online Version
 Chiera, Edward and Kramer, Samuel Noah., Sumerian texts of varied contents, Number 20, University of Chicago Oriental Institute Publications Volume XVI, Cuneiform series - volume IV, 1934. - Online Version
 Chirea, Edward., Sumerian Religious Texts, Constantinople. Musée impérial ottoman, 1924. Online Version
Translation of the Lament, from the Electronic Text Corpus of Sumerian Literature
Composite text, also from ETCSL
Cuneiform Digital Library Initiative - CBS 02204, 02270, 02302, 19751 and N 3144

21st-century BC books
Sumerian texts
Clay tablets
Mesopotamian myths
Religious cosmologies
Comparative mythology
Ur
Third Dynasty of Ur